Saiqa Akhtar, also known as Saiqa (Urdu:سائقہ) is a Pakistani actress. She acted in both Urdu and Punjabi films and is known for her roles in films Baharo Phool Barsao, Mela, Ranga Daku, Jahan Tum Wahan Hum, Ghulami, Angara and Chambaili.

Early life
Saiqa was born in 1958 on 8th September in Lahore, Pakistan. She completed her studies from University of Lahore.

Career
Saiqa made her debut as an actress in 1967 in Urdu film Hamraz. She worked in Lollywood films. She appeared in films Jeera Blade, Taxi Driver, Rangeela, Dil Aur Duniya, Dard, Dhian Nimanian and Meri Zindagi Hay Naghma. Then she changed her name to Saiqa and later she appeared in films Tera Gham Rahay Salamat, Parda Na Uthao, Pyar Ka Mousam, Teray Meray Sapnay and Ajj Dian Kurrian. Since then she appeared in films Heera Tay Basheera, Aas Paas, Aap Say Kya Parda, Aag Ka Samundar, Aakhri Nakha and Mera Insaf. In 1970 she starred in film Rangeela with Munawar Zarif, Rangeela and Sultan Rahi the film was a hit and she won Nigar Award of Best Supporting Actress. Saiqa then stopped working in films after the decline of Pakistan Film Industry. Saiqa then started to work in dramas and appeared in dramas Laa, Raiq Zar, Bol Kaffara and Teri Rah Mein.

Personal life
Saiqa married film and television actor Khayyam Sarhadi and they had three children together. Saiqa's father-in-law Zia Sarhadi was a screenwriter and her niece Zhalay Sarhadi is a model. Saiqa husband Khayyam Sarhadi died in 2011.

Filmography

Television

Telefilm

Film

Awards and recognition

References

External links
 

1958 births
20th-century Pakistani actresses
Living people
Actresses in Punjabi cinema
Pakistani television actresses
Nigar Award winners
Actresses in Pashto cinema
21st-century Pakistani actresses
Actresses in Urdu cinema
Pakistani film actresses